Mobile mapping is the process of collecting geospatial data from a mobile vehicle, typically fitted with a range of GNSS, photographic, radar, laser, LiDAR or any number of remote sensing systems. Such systems are composed of an integrated array of time synchronised navigation sensors and imaging sensors mounted on a mobile platform. The primary output from such systems include GIS data, digital maps, and georeferenced images and video.

History 

The development of direct reading georeferencing technologies opened the way for mobile mapping systems. GPS and Inertial Navigation Systems, have allowed rapid and accurate determination of position and attitude of remote sensing equipment, effectively leading to direct mapping of features of interest without the need for complex post-processing of observed data.

Applications

Aerial mobile mapping 

Traditional techniques of geo-referencing aerial photography, ground profiling radar, or Lidar are prohibitively expensive, particularly in inaccessible areas, or where the type of data collected makes interpretation of individual features difficult. Image direct georeferencing, simplifies the mapping control for large scale mapping tasks.

Emergency response planning 

Mobile mapping systems allow rapid collection of data to allow accurate assessment of conditions on the ground.

Internet applications 

Internet, and mobile device users, are increasingly utilising geo-spatial information, either in the form of mapping, or geo-referenced imaging. Google, Microsoft, and Yahoo have adapted both aerial photographs and satellite images to develop online mapping systems. Street View type images are also an increasing market.

Location aware PDA systems rely on geo-referenced features collated from mobile mapping sources.

Road mapping and highway facility management 

GPS combined with digital camera systems allow rapid update of road maps.

The same system can be utilised to carry out efficient road condition surveys, and facilities management. Laser scanning technologies, applied in the mobile mapping sense, allow full 3D data collection of slope, bankings, etc.

Road Inventory and Asset Management 
Mobile LiDAR with a digital imaging system is being used to gather data which after post-processing generates strip plan, horizontal and vertical profile, all other asset within and beyond ROW including abutting land use and deficient geometry. This also calls for riding quality of pavement, Existing Traffic Characteristics and capacity of the corridor, Speed-flow-density analysis, Road Safety Review of the Corridor, Junction, and median opening, Facilities for commercial vehicles. Thus all data being used to form a performance matrix help identifying the gaps in corridor efficiency for prioritization of interventions to improve corridor efficiency.

Digital Twins applications 
Mobile mapping combined with indoor mapping are being used in creation of digital twins. These digital twins can be a single building or an entire city or country. Several mobile mapping companies, known as "Maker of Digital Twins" are embarking on capturing the digital twins market amid the growing trend among organizations and governments that are adopting digital twins for Internet of Things and Artificial Intelligence applications within the Industrial Revolution 4.0 framework.

Footnotes

References 

 Tao, C. V. (2007) Advances in mobile mapping technology: Volume 4 of International Society for Photogrammetry and Remote Sensing book series. Taylor & Francis. 
 Gao, J. (2009) Digital Analysis of Remotely Sensed Imagery. McGraw Hill Professional. .
 Zlatanova, S. & Li, J. (2008) Geospatial Information Technology for Emergency Response: Volume 6 of International Society for Photogrammetry and Remote Sensing book series. Routledge. .
 Hammoudi, K. et al. (2013) A Synergistic Approach for Recovering Occlusion-Free Textured 3D Maps of Urban Facades from Heterogeneous Cartographic Data. https://doi.org/10.5772/56570
  van Oosterom, Peter (2008) Advances in 3D geoinformation systems: Lecture notes in geoinformation and cartography. Springer. .
 Hofmann-Wellenhof, B., Legat, K., Wieser, M. (2003) Navigation: principles of positioning and guidance Springer. .
 Vitrià, J., Radeva, P., Aguiló, I. (2004) Recent advances in artificial intelligence research and development: Volume 113 of Frontiers in artificial intelligence and applications. IOS Press. .
 Gavrilova, M.L. (2006) Computational science and its applications: ICCSA 2006 : international conference, Glasgow, UK, May 8–11, 2006 : proceedings. Springer. .
 Weng, Q. (2009) Remote Sensing and GIS Integration: Theories, Methods, and Applications McGraw Hill Professional. .

Surveying
Applications of computer vision
Earth sciences
Digital mapping
Satellite meteorology
Remote sensing